Lin Rountree (born September 15, 1971) is an American soul/urban jazz trumpeter, record producer, and composer.  He has recorded six solo albums, the last three for Trippin N' Rhythm Records.  Between the years 2011 - 2018 Lin Rountree released thirteen singles that landed on the National Billboard Top 25 Smooth Jazz Chart which included his single "Pass The Groove" that hit #1 for three consecutive weeks.   Rountree's sixth solo album, Stronger Still, peaked at #20 on the Billboard Top 50 Jazz Albums Chart.  In 2014, Lin Rountree appeared alongside Jordin Sparks and CeeLo Green in the film, Sparkle.

Biography 
Lin Rountree was born September 15, 1971 in New York City, to Linwood and Yvonne Rountree.  He and his family then moved to Alexandria, Virginia, where he attended Hayfield Secondary School.  Upon graduation Rountree went on attend Florida A&M University (FAMU) in Tallahassee, Florida, and became a member of the Marching 100.  While there he became a brother of  Omega Psi Phi fraternity.  He graduated in 1995 with a Bachelor of Science in Business Administration from FAMU's School Of Business and Industry (SBI).

Discography 
Solo albums
 2005  Groovetree (BDK Records/Nu Millennium)
 2008  Sumthin' Good (BDK Records/Nu Millennium)
 2010  SoulTree the Soul-Jazz Experience (Independent)
 2013  Serendipitous (Trippin' N' Rhythm Records)
 2015  SoulFunky (Trippin' N' Rhythm Records)
2018  Stronger Still (Trippin' N' Rhythm Records)
2021  Fluid (Trippin' N' Rhythm Records)

References

1971 births
Living people
Record producers from New York (state)
21st-century American composers
American male composers
American jazz trumpeters
21st-century trumpeters
Florida A&M University alumni
Omega Psi Phi
21st-century American male musicians